Kerala Police is a 2008 Indian Malayalam film, directed by Chandrasekharan, starring Kalabhavan Mani and Lakshmi Sharma in the lead roles.

Cast
 Kalabhavan Mani as Satyanathan
 Lakshmi Sharma as Sanjana 
 Swarnamalya as  Nandini Verma
 Innocent	as Philip Tharakan 
 Suraj Venjaramoodu as Film Producer
 Bijukuttan as Balram	 
 Madhu Warrier as Kiran
 K. P. A. C. Lalitha
 Bindu Panicker
 Baiju as Mukunda Verma

Reception
A critic from Sify gave the film a negative review and wrote that "On the whole Kerala Police is another Mani mass masala movie with scenes you have seen before and a weak climax, that leaves you with a migrane".

References

2008 films
2000s Malayalam-language films